Louis James Lipton (September 19, 1926 – March 2, 2020) was an American writer, lyricist, actor, and dean emeritus of the Actors Studio Drama School at Pace University in New York City. He was the executive producer, writer, and host of the Bravo cable television series Inside the Actors Studio, which debuted in 1994. He retired from the show in 2018.

Early life
Louis James Lipton was born on September 19, 1926, in Detroit, the only child of Betty (née Weinberg), a teacher and librarian, and Lawrence Lipton, a journalist and beat poet. Known for writing the Beat Generation chronicle The Holy Barbarians, Lawrence was a graphic designer, a columnist for the Jewish Daily Forward, and a publicity director for a movie theater. Lawrence was a Polish Jewish emigrant (from Łódź), whose surname was originally Lipschitz. Betty's parents were Russian Jews. His parents divorced when Lipton was six, and his father abandoned the family.

Lipton's family struggled financially, and he started to work at age 13. He worked in high school as a newspaper copy boy for the Detroit Times and as an actor in the Catholic Theater of Detroit and in radio. After graduating from Central High School in Detroit, he attended Wayne State University for one year in the mid-1940s and enlisted in the United States Army Air Forces. In an interview with Vanity Fair, Lipton talked about his time in Paris in the 1950s when he worked for about a year as a pimp. On the Today show, Lipton clarified that he had worked as a beneficent "mec" in the regulated prostitution business.

Career
Lipton portrayed Dan Reid, the Lone Ranger's nephew, on WXYZ Radio's The Lone Ranger. He initially studied to be a lawyer in New York City, and turned to acting to finance his education. He wrote for several soap operas: Another World, The Edge of Night, Guiding Light, The Best of Everything, Return to Peyton Place and Capitol. He also acted for over ten years on The Guiding Light. Lipton studied for two and half years with Stella Adler, four years with Harold Clurman, and two years with Robert Lewis. He also started studying voice and dance (including modern dance and classical ballet), and choreographed a ballet for the American Ballet Theatre.

In 1951, he appeared in the Broadway play The Autumn Garden by Lillian Hellman. He portrayed a shipping clerk turned gang member in Joseph Strick's 1953 film, The Big Break, a crime drama. He was the librettist and lyricist for the short-lived 1967 Broadway musical Sherry!, based on the Moss Hart and George S. Kaufman play The Man Who Came to Dinner, with music by his childhood friend Laurence Rosenthal. The score and orchestrations were lost for over 30 years, and the original cast was never recorded. In 2003, a studio cast recording (with Nathan Lane, Bernadette Peters, Carol Burnett, Tommy Tune, Mike Myers and others) renewed interest in the show.

His book, An Exaltation of Larks, was first published in 1968, and has been in-print and revised several times since then, including a 1993 Penguin Books edition. The book is a collection of "terms of venery", both real and created by Lipton himself. The dust jacket biography for the first edition of Exaltation said his activities included fencing, swimming, and equestrian pursuits and that he had written two Broadway productions.

In 1983, Lipton published his novel, Mirrors, about dancers' lives. He later wrote and produced it as a made-for-television movie. For the genre of television, Lipton produced some two dozen specials including: twelve Bob Hope Birthday Specials; The Road to China, an NBC entertainment special produced in China; and the first televised presidential inaugural gala (for Jimmy Carter).

In 2004, 2005, 2013, and 2019, Lipton appeared on several episodes of Arrested Development as Warden Stefan Gentles. In 2008, he provided the voice for the Director in the Disney animation film Bolt. He played "himself" as Brain Wash, interviewer of the monster Eva's acting teacher in the Paris-Vietnam animated film Igor. Lipton also appears twice in the same episode of Family Guy in cutaways where he simply says "Improv!" both times.

Inside the Actors Studio

In the early 1990s, Lipton was inspired by Bernard Pivot and sought to create a three-year educational program for actors that would be a distillation of what he had learned in the 12 years of his own intensive studies. In 1994, he arranged for the Actors Studio—the home base of "method acting" in the United States for over 60 years—to join with New York City's New School University and form the Actors Studio Drama School, a formal degree-granting program at the graduate level. After ending its contract with the New School, the Actors Studio established The Actors Studio Drama School at Pace University in 2006. 

Lipton created a project within the Actors Studio Drama School: a non-credit class called Inside the Actors Studio (1994), where successful and accomplished actors, directors and writers would be interviewed and would answer questions from acting students. These sessions were also taped, edited, and broadcast on television for the general public to see. The episodes were viewed in 89 million homes throughout 125 countries. Lipton hosted the show and conducted the main interview. In a 2008 interview, when asked if he had anticipated the show's success, Lipton responded, "Not in my wildest imaginations. It was a joint, arduous effort involving many people. At a point and time not too distant in the past, I had three lives. I was the dean of the Actors Studio, the writer of the series, its host and executive producer. I maintained a preposterous sixteen-hour schedule." He was awarded France's Ordre des Arts et des Lettres in 2014 for his work on the show.

Lipton's last Inside the Actors Studio, an interview with Ted Danson, aired on January 11, 2018. In September 2018, Lipton stated that he was stepping down from the program after more than 24 years.

Personal life
Between 1954 and 1959, Lipton was married to actress Nina Foch. He was married to Kedakai Turner Lipton, a model and real estate broker, from 1970 until his death. Kedakai was known as the model playing Miss Scarlett on the cover of the boardgame Clue. She was the book and illustration designer for Lipton's book, An Exaltation of Larks, The Ultimate Edition.

In the 200th episode of Inside the Actors Studio, Lipton revealed that he was an atheist.

Lipton stated in interviews that he was a pilot, certified in Airplane Single Engine Land planes. He had been flying since 1980 and learned in a Cessna 152 and 172, at Van Nuys Airport. As of 2013, he had logged more than 1,000 hours of flight time. Lipton was a member of the Aircraft Owners and Pilots Association.

Death
Lipton died of bladder cancer at his home in Manhattan on March 2, 2020, at the age of 93.

Filmography

Films

Television

As producer

As writer

Published works

See also

 List of awards and nominations received by James Lipton

References

External links

Bravo biography

 
 

1926 births
2020 deaths
20th-century American male actors
20th-century American male writers
20th-century American novelists
20th-century American poets
21st-century American male actors
21st-century American male writers
21st-century American poets
Jewish American atheists
American expatriates in France
American librettists
American male film actors
American male novelists
American male poets
American male radio actors
American male screenwriters
American male soap opera actors
American male television actors
American male television writers
American people of Polish-Jewish descent
American soap opera writers
American television producers
American television talk show hosts
American university and college faculty deans
Ballet choreographers
Central High School (Detroit) alumni
Chevaliers of the Ordre des Arts et des Lettres
Choreographers of American Ballet Theatre
Deaths from bladder cancer
Deaths from cancer in New York (state)
Jewish American male actors
Jewish American writers
Male actors from Detroit
Military personnel from Detroit
Novelists from Michigan
Novelists from New York (state)
Pace University faculty
United States Army Air Forces personnel of World War II
Wayne State University people
Writers from Detroit